Helleh  is a Syrian village located in Kafr Takharim Nahiyah in Harem District, Idlib.  According to the Syria Central Bureau of Statistics (CBS), Helleh had a population of 277 in the 2004 census.

References 

Populated places in Harem District